Dohenys is a Gaelic Athletic Association club, fielding Gaelic football and Hurling teams in the town of Dunmanway, County Cork, Ireland. It won its only Cork Senior Club Football Championship in 1897.
Other titles won include 2 Cork Intermediate Football Championships in 1972 and 1995, and 3 Cork Junior Football Championships in 1935, 1966, and 1993. In 2007, the club won its first ever county hurling championship when it won the Cork Junior B Hurling Championship. The club is part of the Carbery division of Cork. The Sam Maguire Cup which is presented to the All-Ireland winning football team each year is named after Dunmanway's most famous son, Sam Maguire who is buried in St. Mary's Graveyard.

History
Dohenys GAA club was founded in 1886.  The first chairman of the club was a local national school teacher, John McCarthy. The club attended the first meeting of the Cork County Board and became the first affiliated club in west Cork. The official name adopted by the club was the Michael Doheny Football Club after the Tipperary Young Irelander, Michael Doheny, who spent a short time in Dunmanway when on 'the run' in 1847. 
In 1897, the club won the Cork Senior Football Championship by defeating Wolf Tones of Kanturk in the final. This team won its way through Munster Senior Football Championship but was defeated by Kickhams of Dublin in the All-Ireland Senior Football Championship final at Jones’ Road, a game played in February 1899. 

Although no further senior title has been won the club has won Cork Intermediate Football Championship titles in 1972 and 1995, and Cork Junior Football Championship titles in 1935, 1966 and 1993. Many Carbery titles at all levels, in both football and hurling, have also been won.

Honours
 Cork Senior Football Championship Winners (1) 1897  Runners-Up 1898, 1903, 1975, 2006
 Cork Intermediate Football Championship Winners (2) 1972, 1995  Runners-Up 1923, 1936, 1938, 1969
 Cork Junior Football Championship Winners (3) 1935, 1966, 1993  Runners-Up 1898, 1959, 1965
 Cork Junior B Hurling Championship Winners (1) 2006 Runners-Up 1996
 Cork Premier 2 Minor Football Championship (as Sam Maguires) Winners (1) 2010
 Cork Minor A Football Championship Runners-Up 1999
 Cork Minor B Hurling Championship (1): 2001 (as Sam Maguires)
 West Cork Junior A Hurling Championship Winners (4) 1958, 1959, 1963, 2013 Runners-Up 1936, 1937, 1938, 1960, 1974, 1975, 2010, 2011, 2012
 West Cork Junior A Football Championship (12): 1927, 1931, 1935, 1956, 1957, 1958, 1959, 1962, 1965, 1966, 1992, 1993 Runners-Up 1928, 1930, 1940, 1949, 1950, 1963, 1970, 1990
 West Cork Junior B Hurling Championship Winners (2) 1996, 1998  Runners-Up 1953, 1984, 2004
 West Cork Junior B Football Championship Winners (1) 2015
 West Cork Junior C Football Championship Winners (5) 1977, 1978, 1979, 1986, 1987  Runners-Up 1984, 1985, 1988, 1998
 West Cork Junior C Hurling Championship Runners-Up 1994
 West Cork Junior D Football Championship Winners (1) 1998 Runners-Up 2005, 2014
 West Cork Minor A Hurling Championship (as Sam Maguires) Winners (1) 1956
 West Cork Minor A Football Championship (as Sam Maguires) Winners (6) 1942, 1944, 1978, 1998, 1999, 2003  Runners-Up 1969, 1970, 1972, 1974, 1986, 1989
 West Cork Minor B Hurling Championship (as Sam Maguires) Winners (5) 1990, 1994, 1996, 2003, 2009  Runners-Up 1982, 1985, 2006, 2014
 West Cork Minor C Hurling Championship (as Sam Maguires) Runners-Up 2001
 West Cork Under-21 Football Championship Winners (5) 1969, 1970, 1971, 2000, 2017  Runners-Up 1974, 1997, 1999, 2001, 2003, 2019
 West Cork Under-21 B Hurling Championship Winners (2) 1995, 2008  Runners-Up 1991, 1996, 2009, 2011
 West Cork Under-21 C Hurling Championship Runners-Up 2002, 2003

Notable players

 Liam Grainger
 Darren Sweetnam
 Éamonn Young
 Jim Young

References

External links
Official Dohenys Club website

Gaelic games clubs in County Cork
Gaelic football clubs in County Cork
Hurling clubs in County Cork